Priscilla Novaes Leone (born October 7, 1977, in Salvador, Bahia), better known as Pitty, is a Brazilian rock singer.

She had played in two bands, Shes and Inkoma, before starting her solo career in 2003. She has sold over 2 million copies in her career, being one of the best selling rock artists in the 2000s. Pitty was voted the sexiest rock singer of Latin America and Brazil, and the 35th sexiest rock singer in the world in 2010.

She was the most awarded Brazilian rock artist of the 2000s.

Pitty won several awards at the MTV Video Music Brazil, among them Artist of the Year twice, Video of the Year, Best Live Performance, and three times as the lead singer of the Dream Band. Pitty won approximately 51 awards during her seven-year career, a record.

In 2011 Pitty gave an interview to a live social network, Orkut, talking about the launch of its new DVD, thus inaugurating, Orkut Live where you have exclusive interviews with celebrities. She also made 10 songs from the DVD A Trupe Delirante No Circo Voador available YouTube on 10/05. This was the first time that an entry uses two of the main platforms of Google in Brazil, Orkut and YouTube.

In 2011 Pitty appeared on position 14 of Billboard magazines Social 50 chart, the highest debut for a national artist in the chart. She also reached the third position in the magazines Uncharted chart, overcoming Luan Santana and becoming the most influential Brazilian on the Web.

In 2014 Pitty announced that her main band is back, with shows already confirmed by the band's production. So it was announced by the British producer Tim Palmer in social networks, revealing the end of the mix of singles of the new album, which was released in June 2014 in (CD and vinyl). The set includes 10 songs, all unpublished and authored by singer Pitty. "SETEVIDAS" features the production of Rafael Ramos and the mix of Tim Palmer who has produced singles by Pearl Jam, Ozzy Osbourne, The Cure, David Bowie and U2.

Early life
Pitty was born on October 7, 1977, in Salvador, Bahia and spent her childhood in Porto Seguro. Her father, a musician and bar owner, played the songs a lot of Raul Seixas, and many other rockers of the 1960s and 1970s like The Beatles, Elvis Presley and Lou Reed. Later, artists such as AC/DC, Nirvana, Alice in Chains, Metallica, Pantera, Faith No More, Rita Lee, The Smiths, Ira, The Mars Volta, Queens of the Stone Age, Joan Jett, The White Stripes, Muse, and the singer Madonna were her main influences.

She attended the School of Music Federal University of Bahia.

Career
She grew up amidst the backdrop of Bahian independent bands, with the wheels which appeared in concert in a bar in Salvador. One day she entered the circle singing "Smells Like Teen Spirit" by Nirvana and the band has since decided to invest in music, with support from big name in the underground scene Big Brother Roger (owner of the seal bigbross records).

Pitty played drums in the Brazilian band Shes from 1997 to 1999. The band also featured Carol Ribeiro (guitar), Liz Bee (guitar, vocals) and Lulu (bass). From 1995 to 2001 she was the vocalist for the hardcore band Inkoma, which she released several albums with. When Inkoma ended, she was invited by the producer Rafael Ramos to record a solo album.

Admiravel Chip Novo and Anacrônico (2003–2005)
In 2003, Pitty released their first album, Admiravel Chip Novo, which sold over 820,000 copies, the biggest selling rock album in Brazil in 2003. The singles "Máscara", "Admirável Chip Novo", "Teto de Vidro" and 'Equalize' were successful in Brazil and hit number one. The album title was inspired by Aldous Huxley's Brave New World (translated to Portuguese as "Admirável Mundo Novo").
Admiravel Chip Novo was nominated for a Latin Grammy in the category Best Brazilian Rock Album.

In 2005 she released her second album Anacrônico. The album sold over 610,000 copies and was the best selling rock album in Brazil in 2005.

{Des}Concerto Ao Vivo (2007–2008)
In 2007, after the tour of Anacrônico, Pitty released her first live DVD, the (Des)Concerto Ao Vivo. Besides being released on CD, DVD, and DualDisc, the record was also released in a unit cell model, the result of a partnership with Nokia. Thus, Pitty was awarded the "Platinum Mobile" by selling 450 thousand devices containing her album.

Chiaroscuro and new directions (2009–2011)
In 2009, Pitty released her latest album  Chiaroscuro. The album's first single, "Me Adora", soon reached the first places in the main Brazilian radio stations. Chiaroscuro won a mobile game that is based on her music, something unprecedented in the country, called Chiaroscuro: The Game.

A Trupe Delirante No Circo Voador (2010-2011)
In 2011, Pitty released her second live album, recorded at Circo Voador, A Trupe Delirante No Circo Voador. The show was recorded in Rio de Janeiro in December, during a performance that featured special guests, in addition to their official band (guitarist Martin, bassist and drummer Joe Duda). The live show featured typical songs and some of his hits during his career, marked by great successes.

A Trupe Delirante No Circo Voador was nominated for a Latin Grammy in the category Best Brazilian Rock Album.

In December 2011, the band ended the tour "A Trupe Delirante em Turnê". In reference to your work, Pitty got great achievements in this tour as, for example, shows held in the United States, which were noticed by one of the largest newspapers in print media in the world, The New York Times. The newspaper compared the band with renowned bands like Guns n 'Roses and Joan Jett. Pitty was also the highlight of the American Billboard magazine that keeps the artists greatest hits of the world. There was also the launch of the tour with Live Orkut and YouTube platforms.

Agridoce (2011-2013)
In 2011, Pitty and Martin developed a side project called Agridoce.

SETEVIDAS & Turnê Setevidas – Ao Vivo (2014-2016)
In 2014 in the album release week of Setevidas, the singer Pitty was featured with the new CD and entered the top 200 of more than 12 countries: Mexico, United States, Spain, Paraguay, Chile, Argentina, Brazil and others. Being the album with the biggest positive reception of criticism in 2014 by the Brazilian media and the career of singer Pitty. The second single "Serpente" topped the tops of the main Brazilian radio stations and is currently considered the most successful single of the album.

In February 2016, it was announced that the singer, together with the band Os Paralamas do Sucesso and singers Nando Reis and Paula Toller, would take part of a tour promoted by the project Nivea Viva!, which takes place every year and takes artists on Brazilian tours. The series of 7 shows will pay tribute to Brazilian rock.

In 2019, her album Matriz was nominated for the Latin Grammy Award for Best Portuguese Language Rock or Alternative Album.

Discography

Studio Albums & Vinyls

Live Albums, DVDs & Vinyls

Extended Play (EP)
 2003: Lado Z
 2007: Estúdio Coca-Cola

Compilations DVDs
 2004: Admirável Vídeo Novo
 2006: Anacrônico (DualDisc)
 2010: Chiaroscope
 2015: Pela Fresta

Singles

Casulo   
Diamante

Backing band
Current members
 Pitty - vocals, rhythm guitar
 Martin – lead guitar, backing vocals
 Guilherme Alemida - bass, backing vocals
 Duda – drums
 Paulo Kishimoto - keyboards

Former members
 Luciano Granja – lead guitar (2003)
 Peu Sousa † - lead guitar, backing vocals (2003–04)
 Joe - bass, backing vocals
 Brunno Cunha – keyboards (2003–06)

Filmography
 2009: É Proibido Fumar (as Mikaela, participation)

References

External links
Pitty Official website  (in Portuguese/English)

1977 births
Living people
Brazilian women guitarists
Brazilian women rock singers
Feminist musicians
Brazilian people of Italian descent
People from Salvador, Bahia
21st-century Brazilian women singers
21st-century Brazilian singers
21st-century guitarists
21st-century women guitarists